Eva Wikström (born 14 February 1968) is a Swedish judoka. She competed in the women's half-lightweight event at the 1992 Summer Olympics.

References

External links
 

1968 births
Living people
Swedish female judoka
Olympic judoka of Sweden
Judoka at the 1992 Summer Olympics
People from Mora Municipality
Sportspeople from Dalarna County
20th-century Swedish women